Admiral Henry Lancelot Mawbey, CB, CVO (17 June 1870 – 4 June 1933) was a Royal Navy officer. He was Director of the Royal Indian Marine from 1920 to 1922.

References 

1870 births
1933 deaths
Royal Navy admirals
Royal Navy personnel of World War I
Royal Indian Navy admirals
Companions of the Order of the Bath
Commanders of the Royal Victorian Order